Stepantsevo is a rural locality (a village) in Myaksinskoye Rural Settlement, Cherepovetsky District, Vologda Oblast, Russia. The population was 23 as of 2002.

Geography 
Stepantsevo is located 41 km southeast of Cherepovets (the district's administrative centre) by road. Travlinka is the nearest rural locality.

References 

Rural localities in Cherepovetsky District